Fields is a surname. Notable people with the surname include:

Arts and entertainment
 A. Roland Fields (1884–?) (also known as Al Fields), American art director
 Brandon Fields (musician), American musician
 Danny Fields (born 1939), American music manager, publicist, journalist, and author born Daniel Feinberg
 Dorothy Fields (1904–1974), American librettist and lyricist
 Frank Fields (1914–2005), American musician
 Fred Fields, American game artist
 Freddie Fields (1923–2007), American theatrical agent and film director born Fred Feldman
 Gracie Fields (1898–1979), British actress, singer, and comedian
 Joseph Fields (1895–1966), American playwright, theatre director, screenwriter, and film producer
 Kim Fields (born 1969), American actress and director
 Lew Fields (1867–1941), American actor, comedian, vaudeville star, theatre manager, and producer born Moses Schoenfeld
 Tony Fields (1958–1995), American dancer
 Totie Fields (1930–1978), American comedian
 W. C. Fields (1880–1946), American comedian, actor, juggler, and writer born William Claude Dukenfield

Business
 Dana Leslie Fields, American magazine publisher, inaugural inductee into the magazine hall of fame
 Debbi Fields (born 1956), founder and spokesperson of Mrs. Fields Bakeries
 Mark Fields (businessman) (born 1961), president and CEO of Ford Motor Company

Politics
 Jack Fields (born 1952), American politician and businessman
 T. T. Fields (1912–1994), American politician who served in the Louisiana House (1952-1972)
 Thomas C. Fields (1825–1885), New York politician and state senator
 William Fields (politician) (1810–1854), American politician who served in the Texas House
 William J. Fields (1874–1954), Governor of Kentucky (1923–1927)

Religion
 Harvey J. Fields (1935–2014), American Reform rabbi
 Wilmer Clemont Fields (1922–2018), American Southern Baptist minister

Science, mathematics and academia
 Barbara J. Fields (born 1947), American professor of American history
 Bernard N. Fields (1938–1995), American microbiologist, virologist and member of the National Academy of Sciences
 Edda L. Fields-Black, née Fields, African-American historian
 John Charles Fields (1863–1932), Canadian mathematician and founder of the Fields Medal
 Rona M. Fields (1932–2016), American psychologist, feminist and author

Sports
 Benn Fields (born 1954), American high jumper
 Brandon Fields (born 1984), American National Football League player
 DaMarcus Fields (born 1998), American football player
 Jackie Fields (1908–1987), American boxer, twice world welterweight champion
 Josh Fields (infielder) (born 1982), American former Major League Baseball player
 Josh Fields (pitcher) (born 1985), American Major League Baseball player
 Justin Fields (born 1999), American football player
 Kenny Fields (born 1962), American National Basketball Association player
 Landry Fields (born 1988), American National Basketball Association executive and former player
 Mark Fields (cornerback) (born 1996), American football player
 Mark Fields (linebacker) (born 1972), American National Football League player
 Roemon Fields (born 1990), American baseball player
 Shay Fields (born 1996), American football player
 Tony Fields II (born 1999), American National Football League player

Other
 Rich Fields (born 1960), American broadcaster, spokesman, announcer, and meteorologist

See also 
 Field (surname)

Surnames of British Isles origin